Anastassia Sinitsina (born 2004) is an Estonian chess player who holds the title of Woman FIDE Master. In 2021 and 2022 she won the Estonian Women Chess Championship.

Biography
From the mid-2010s Anastassia Sinitsina was one of the leading young chess players in Estonia.

In 2014 she won bronze medal in European Youth Chess Championship in girls U10 age group. Also in this year she won European Youth Chess Championship in rapid and blitz chess in girls U10 age groups.

In 2016 Anastassia Sinitsina won bronze medal in Estonian Women's Chess Championship after play-off tournament. In April 2017, in Riga she participated in the Women's European Individual Chess Championship 2017.

In 2018 Anastassia Sinitsina won Estonian Girls U14 Chess Championship and Estonian Youth U16 Chess Championship.

In 2021 she won Estonian Women's Chess Championship. In 2022 she won Estonian Women's Chess Championship.

References

External links

2004 births
Living people
Estonian female chess players
Chess Woman FIDE Masters